Hearst Television, Inc. (formerly Hearst-Argyle Television) is a broadcasting company in the United States owned by Hearst Communications. From 1998 to mid-2009, the company traded its common stock on the New York Stock Exchange under the symbol "HTV."

Hearst-Argyle was formed in 1997 with the merger of Hearst Corporation's broadcasting division and stations owned by Argyle Television Holdings II, which is partially related to the company of the same name who (in 1994) sold its stations to New World Communications, stations that eventually became Fox-owned stations (Hearst itself, unusual for any American broadcast group, has never held a Fox affiliation on any of its stations). Hearst's involvement in broadcasting dates to the 1920s.

In terms of audience reach, Hearst is the third-largest group owner of ABC-affiliated stations, behind the E. W. Scripps Company and Sinclair Broadcast Group, and ahead of Tegna Inc., and the second-largest group owner of NBC affiliates, behind Tegna.

Hearst-owned ABC affiliates in National Football League markets simulcast Monday Night Football games from ESPN that involve these teams - ESPN is 20% owned by Hearst, the rest being owned by ABC's parent, The Walt Disney Company. Other Hearst-owned stations also carry ESPN-aired NFL games, even though they are affiliated with other networks (like WBAL-TV, Baltimore's NBC affiliate). Hearst also holds some joint ventures for syndicated programming with NBCUniversal Television Distribution.

On June 3, 2009, the Hearst Corporation announced that it would purchase substantially all of the stock not held by Hearst. Hearst-Argyle Television then dropped "Argyle" from its name and became a wholly-owned subsidiary of the Hearst Corporation.

Digital television
In February 2009, Hearst-Argyle announced that its stations (except for KITV and its satellites in Hawaii, which had already completed their transition to digital, and WPTZ in Plattsburgh, New York and WNNE in Hartford, Vermont, which followed the other Champlain Valley in transitioning on February 17, 2009) would comply with the new DTV transition date of June 12, 2009.

Hearst-owned stations

Currently, Hearst owns a total of 34 overall television stations but considers two groups of four stations and an NBC station with an ABC digital subchannel joint operations, bringing its count down to 31 under that consideration: eleven NBC affiliates, fifteen ABC affiliates (one as a subchannel of an NBC affiliate, and one which acts as a two-station simulcast), two CBS affiliates, six CW affiliates (two traditional, two subchannel (which are part of a two-station simulcast), and two channel shares), one MyNetworkTV affiliate, and one independent station. Most of the company's subchannel stations broadcast either Weigel Broadcasting's MeTV or NBC's Cozi TV through national affiliation deals, along with being charter carriers of Weigel's two newest concepts, Heroes & Icons, and Story Television. Since December 1, 2014, Des Moines CBS affiliate KCCI has used its third subchannel as an H&I affiliate carrying MyNetworkTV programming in primetime. Hearst also owns two radio stations in Baltimore, the last remaining from the company divesting most of their radio assets after the Telecommunications Act of 1996 went into effect. As already mentioned above, none of Hearst's stations have ever held a Fox affiliation, with the exception of two WMUR translators in the northern part of New Hampshire dis-affiliating with the network upon Hearst's assumption of ownership of WMUR.

Some Hearst-owned stations use the "Commitment (Year)" banner for all political news coverage leading up to the local, national, and statewide elections in lieu of a localized version of their associated network's political branding. This started in 2000. Hearst also maintains a Washington, D.C. bureau to assist its stations in coverage of national politics, including on-air reporters and facilities and equipment assistance for local stations. Many Hearst stations license the "Operation High School" branding for coverage of local high school sports. In 2007, Hearst-Argyle became one of the first television broadcasting groups to post its news stories on YouTube. WCVB, KCRA, WTAE, WBAL and WMUR were the first stations in Hearst-Argyle's station group to do this.

In 1980, the Hearst Broadcasting division had purchased WDTN in Dayton from Grinnell College, a price estimated to be $45–48 million.

Until 2009, three of Hearst's television stations (KCWE, WMOR-TV, and WPBF) and its two radio stations (WBAL radio and WIYY) were owned by Hearst Broadcasting, Inc., an indirect wholly-owned subsidiary of the Hearst Corporation through which Hearst ultimately controlled Hearst-Argyle Television, as opposed to Hearst-Argyle itself; Hearst-Argyle still operated these stations under a management services agreement. These stations were transferred to Hearst Television shortly after its privatization. Hearst's television and radio cluster in Baltimore additionally serves as the flagship stations and operation bases for the Baltimore Ravens radio and television networks, and as the flagship/operations base for the Baltimore Orioles Radio Network.

On August 20, 2014, it was announced that Hearst Television would acquire WVTM in Birmingham, Alabama and WJCL in Savannah, Georgia from Media General, which divested those stations under FCC advisement as part of its acquisition of LIN Media.

On January 6, 2017, Hearst acquired majority control of Charleston, South Carolina-based syndicator Litton Entertainment, which has control of four of the five E/I-compliant Saturday morning blocks on the five major broadcast networks, along with being a syndicator of traditional programming. The deal closed on February 1.

In 2021, Hearst began to carry the home shopping network Shop LC on several its stations under a revenue-sharing agreement with that network's owners. In most markets, Hearst will not pursue cable or satellite carriage for Shop LC, as the network already pays providers nationwide to carry its network on several channel slots per system.

On September 20, 2021, Hearst launched Very Local, an over-the-top media service which consists of news programming from its television stations as well as nationally produced content such as Chronicle and Matter of Fact.

Television production

Hearst Television also produces the weekly public-affairs program Matter of Fact with Soledad O'Brien, which in fall 2018 entered its fourth season. Outside of the Hearst stations and A&E, the show is distributed in national broadcast syndication by Sony Pictures Television.

In 2019, former Today consumer affairs reporter Jeff Rossen joined Hearst as a multi-platform consumer affairs reporter, whose reports (which as of April 2020, include COVID-19 pandemic consumer issue Q&A segments) are syndicated throughout the chain, in addition to full-scale semi-annual consumer specials that are also carried by Hearst Television stations.

Hearst once owned Hearst-Argyle Television Productions, a rebranding of the original Hearst Broadcasting Productions in 1997, which was merged with Kelly News & Entertainment chain, which Hearst bought it out, along with KCRA-TV in 1998. In 2001, the inventory was sold off to NBC Enterprises.

Television stations 
Stations are listed alphabetically by state and city of license.
 (**) – Indicates a station that was built and signed-on by Hearst.

Radio stations

Stations formerly owned by Hearst and/or Argyle II

Former television stations 

In addition to the above, Hearst-Argyle never owned WZZM or WGRZ. Those two stations were divested by one of the company's predecessors, Argyle Television Holdings II, several months prior to the merger with Hearst Broadcasting. The "years owned" information reflects the years of ownership by Argyle Television Holdings II. And WDTN was the only formerly owned television station that was owned directly by Hearst prior to the merger.

Former radio stations 
(a partial listing)

Notes

References

External links 
 

 
Television broadcasting companies of the United States
Joint ventures
Hearst Communications assets
Companies formerly listed on the New York Stock Exchange
Hearst Communications
Radio broadcasting companies of the United States